Østerbro Stadium is a combined football and athletics stadium in Copenhagen, Denmark. It is the home of the football clubs Boldklubben af 1893 and BK Skjold and it is also the home stadium of the athletics clubs Københavns Idræts Forening and Sparta. It has a capacity of approximately 4,400. The stadium is currently being renovated, to meet the demands from the Danish Football Association. The field will be made both longer and wider and a new track will be laid for track and field. The stadium was used for the 2009 World Outgames.

References

External links
 Østerbro Stadion Nordic Stadiums

Boldklubben af 1893
Athletics (track and field) venues in Denmark
Football venues in Denmark
Multi-purpose stadiums in Denmark
Sports venues in Copenhagen